Afferent may refer to:

Anatomical structures 
Meaning "conveying towards a center":
 Afferent arterioles, blood vessels that supply the nephrons
 Afferent lymphatic vessels, lymph vessels that carry lymph to a lymph node
 Afferent nerve fiber, an axonal projection that arrives at a particular region

Other uses 
 Afferent couplings, in software, classes in other packages that depend upon classes within a given package

See also 
 Efferent (disambiguation)